The "Blue Eye" is a water spring and natural phenomenon occurring near the village of Muzinë in Finiq municipality, southern Albania. A popular tourist attraction, the clear blue water of the river can be seen from a depth of more than fifty metres. Divers have descended to fifty metres, but it is still unclear what the actual depth of the karst hole is.

This phenomenon is also known as 'springs of Bistricë' as it is the initial water source of Bistricë river, 25 km long, which ends in the Ionian Sea south of Sarandë. The source stands at an altitude of 152 m and has a discharge rate of 18400 L/s.

The immediate area  is a Nature Monument and is characterized by oak and sycamore trees. In summer 2004, the source was temporarily dried up.

In the summer of 2017 part of the location was burnt by wildfire.

See also 
 Protected areas of Albania
 Geography of Albania
 Tourism in Albania

References 

 

 

Springs of Albania
Vlorë County
Tourist attractions in Vlorë County
Tourist attractions in Sarandë
Karst springs